Luc Dupanloup, more famous under his pen name Dupa, was a Belgian comics artist best known as the creator of Cubitus which later was turned into an animated series called Wowser. He was born on 12 February 1945 in Montignies-sur-Sambre and died on 8 November 2000 in Ottignies.

Awards
 Crayon d'Argent in 1973
 Aigle d'Or de la Ville de Nice in 1982
 Prize of the best book for children at the  BD de Paris convention in 1984
 "110 d'Or" price in November 1993 at the BD Festival of Illzach

Bibliography
Cubitus (43 albums) 1972–2000
Chlorophylle (3 albums) 1973–1977
Alice au pays des merveilles (1 album) 1973
Constant Souci (1 album) 1974
Coup d'oeil (1 album) 1984
Niky (3 albums) 1985–1988
Le Verrou (1 album) 1987
Bédémix (2 albums) 1989
Les Vacances de Petit Biniou (1 album) 1997

References

BD Paradisio
Bedetheque
Lycos
fan page

Footnotes

External links

Presentation on Lambiek Comiclopedia
Comic Book Database

1945 births
2000 deaths
Artists from Charleroi
Belgian comics artists
Belgian comics writers
Belgian humorists
Belgian surrealist artists